Armandinho may refer to:

 Armandinho (Brazilian guitarist) (born 1953), Brazilian MPB guitarist and singer from Bahia
 Armandinho (singer) (born 1970), Brazilian reggae singer from Rio Grande do Sul
 Armandinho (fado guitarist)  (1891–1946), Portuguese fado guitarist
 Armandinho (footballer) (1911–1972), Brazilian footballer
 Armandinho Manjate (born 1965), former footballer and coach